No. 105 Helicopter Unit (Daring Eagles) is a Helicopter Unit and is equipped with Mil Mi-17 and based at Gorakhpur Air Force Station.

History

Assignments

Aircraft
Mi-17

References

105